Moldovan protests may refer to:

 The 2002 Moldovan protests
 The April 2009 Moldovan parliamentary election protests
 The 2015–2016 protests in Moldova
 The 2020 Moldovan protests
 The Moldovan protests (2022–present)